Infinite Stratos, also written as , is a Japanese light novel series by Izuru Yumizuru with illustrations provided by Okiura (original MF novels) and CHOCO (new Overlap novels). As of October 2013, seven volumes have been published by Media Factory under their MF Bunko J label. From volume 8 onwards, the novels are published by Overlap under their Overlap Bunko label.

A manga adaptation by Kenji Akahoshi was serialized in the seinen manga magazine Monthly Comic Alive from May 2010 to July 2012 with five volumes published under their Alive Comics imprint. A 12-episode anime adaptation by Eight Bit aired in Japan between January and March 2011, and an original video animation (OVA) episode was released on December 7, 2011. The anime is licensed by Sentai Filmworks in North America, who released the series in April 2012. A second series aired from October to December 2013.

Plot
In the near future, a Japanese scientist creates a high-tech powered exoskeleton called "Infinite Stratos" (IS). Possessing technology and combat capabilities far surpassing that of any other arms system, the IS threatens to destabilize the world. Faced with such an overpowered weapon, the world's nations enact the "Alaska Treaty", stating that ISes shall never be used for military combat purposes, and that the existing IS technology must be equally distributed to all nations, to prevent any one nation from dominating the others. However, sometime after the IS was introduced, society has undergone a drastic change. As ISes can only be operated by women, there is a shift in the power balance between men and women, where women now dominate society over men.

Ten years after the IS was initially introduced, the world has entered a new age of peace. However, a 15-year-old Japanese boy named Ichika Orimura changes everything. During an accidental run-in with a hibernating IS suit, it is revealed that he possesses the innate ability to operate an IS—the only male in the world capable of doing so. Seeing his potential, the Japanese government forcibly enrolls the bewildered young man in the prestigious Infinite Stratos Academy, a multicultural academy where IS pilots from all over the world are trained. Thus, he starts a busy high school life surrounded by girls training to become expert IS pilots. While they seem to be enjoying their thrilling school life, the danger of looming threats and enemies is never too far away.

Characters

Main characters

Ichika is a first year student and class representative, as well as Vice President of the Student Council at IS Academy. His older sister, Chifuyu, is a legendary IS pilot who raised him when the siblings' parents abandoned them at a young age. During the second Mondo Grosso tournament, he was kidnapped by the Phantom Task, which effectively caused Chifuyu to forfeit the match to rescue him, which he regrets as he feels he is a weak brother. As the first male IS pilot, his new reputation has made him somewhat famous as many scientists and engineers would like to study him. He often seems absent minded and oblivious to the feelings of the girls around him and seems to misunderstand their feelings towards him (though he seems to understand Houki's words during the second-to-last episode of the first season when they almost kissed). It is later revealed that Ichika is aware of the girls' feelings for him, but avoids such affections due to being the only male in school, and the fact that if he does choose a girl, the other girls will kill him. Volume 12 now signifies Ichika is an artificial human part of the "Orimura Plan".

He is a very kind person and he will go to great lengths to achieve a goal he has set for himself. He pilots the  IS, a prototype, one of only two developed 4th generation IS focused on short-range melee attacks. He also possesses Chifuyu's , upgraded from the version used by his sister; and Core Number 001, the very first IS core. Later on, Byakushiki undergoes Second Shift shortly after Houki Shinonono acquires her personal unit, Akatsubaki. In the resulting Second Shift form, named , it is equipped with a multi-function unit (A.I.) , which has: a high-caliber charged particle cannon, an energy claw for close-quarters combat, and an energy shield with the One-Off ability. In its Second Shift, Byakushiki also gains an increase in mobility through the addition of four large wing thrusters, enabling it to execute Double Ignition Boost. In this Second Shift form, it, and Houki's Akatsubaki, are the most advanced IS ever made.

 
Houki is a first-year student at the IS Academy and Ichika's childhood friend, though they have not seen each other for six years. She has a very long ponytail. Her place of residence is home to a kendo dojo, which led to her early interest in kendo. Houki even competes in kendo competitions at a national level, and was the winner of the national tournament that was hosted one year before the story of Infinite Stratos began. She is part of the kendo club at the IS academy. Her older sister, Tabane Shinonono, is the creator of the IS, though their relationship is strained. Six years ago, Ichika agreed to become her boyfriend if she could win the national kendo tournament of their grade. However, the day of the tournament was also the day the IS was introduced to the world. Due to the familial links to Tabane, Houki's family was placed under government protection and Houki was forced to withdraw from the kendo tournament. Since that incident, Houki resented her sister for moving her away from Ichika and abandoning their family.

Despite not seeing him for a long time, Houki still harbors strong feelings of love for Ichika, as her continuing practice of kendo was her only link to him. She was his initial roommate before the arrivals of Charlotte Dunois and Tatenashi Sarashiki, and tends to get jealous when other girls are around him. The Akatsubaki has a One-Off ability called , which allows Houki to replenish both her own and other IS's energy when she comes in contact with them. However, because she is still unskilled as a pilot and her compatibility with the IS is only at grade C, she is still considered to be on the same level of the other girls. As of Volume 7, her compatibility has risen to grade S.

Cecilia is a first year student at the IS Academy and is an IS Cadet Representative of the United Kingdom. Her family is part of the British aristocracy. Her father, a spoiled and timid man who had little influence both inside and outside the Alcott family, made her swear to never marry a weak man (which is difficult due to the shift in social status). Upon losing her parents in a deadly train accident when she was 12 years old, Cecilia was forced to protect her family fortune from those who wished to claim a stake of it. After showing high IS aptitude, she made a deal with the British government, who, in exchange for protecting her family's assets, wanted her to go to the IS Academy as a Cadet Representative to gather data for their latest 3rd-generation model. She was almost defeated by Ichika for the position of class representative, but won due to a technicality, but later ceded her position to Ichika as an apology for her attitude in the previous days. She soon starts to see him as a true man and falls in love with him. She pilots the  IS, a long-range sniper-class IS, which can deploy four remotely controlled "drones" (B.I.T.S. System) for engaging enemies at medium range. In the anime, Blue Tears is shown to also have a pair of rocket launchers attached to the hips, in place of two other Blue Tears shown in the light novels, used at close to long-range on different occasions.

Lingyin is a first year student at the IS Academy, the class representative of her class and is an IS Cadet Representative of China. As with Houki, Lingyin has been friends with Ichika since their early childhood. She has been in love with Ichika ever since he protected her against four school delinquents. Lingyin at first becomes extremely hostile to Ichika after he forgets the details of a promise they made as kids (in which it was implied; although not explicitly stated, that if she became an excellent cook, he would become her boyfriend). She is also called . Her family ran a Chinese restaurant that Ichika would often eat at before Ling's parents divorced and she moved back to China.

Charlotte is a first year student at the IS Academy and is an IS Cadet Representative of France. Charlotte initially called herself , posing as the second "male" IS pilot student who was transferred into Ichika's class. However, her plan was to spy on Ichika, discover how he was able to pilot an IS, and acquire data from his IS (which at the time was considered the most advanced 3rd-generation unit). Because she enrolled as a male IS pilot, she was paired with Ichika as roommates since they are "both" guys. As a result of this arrangement, Ichika later discovered her true gender when he inadvertently walked in on her showering. Upon learning that Charlotte's father and his corporation used her to spy on him, Ichika decided to help protect her. She later falls in love with Ichika due to his bravery. She pilots the  IS, a 2nd-generation custom multi-range IS possessing a wide array of interchangeable weapons allowing for fast battlefield adaptation and capable of performing the Ignition Boost. Her weapons, once called upon, can be used by another IS pilot as long as she grants permission. Due to her training to make her a convincing male prior to her entry to the IS Academy, Charlotte uses "boku" (an informal male equivalent of "I") when referring to herself. Following the Silver Gospel Incident in later novels, Charlotte becomes Laura's roommate.

Laura is a first-year student at the IS Academy and an IS Cadet Representative of Germany. A genetically-engineered super-soldier, Laura is the commander of the German IS special forces, . She has a red eye and long silver hair; but her most distinct feature being a black eyepatch covering her glowing-yellow left eye, the result of a failed nano-machine experiment meant to help her pilot an IS better. Laura was under Chifuyu's tutelage when the latter was an instructor for the German army following the 2nd Mondo Grosso, and holds Chifuyu in high regard for helping her and was her role model when she suffered a depression for not being the strongest. Her current name is actually a code name given to her by the German military, as she was artificially created from human DNA. She has an elder sister, Chloe Chronicle, who is capable of infiltrating a person's mind through virtual reality via manipulate the modules around them.

Laura pilots the  IS, a medium-to-long-range artillery-type IS. The Schwarzer Regen possess several remotely guided tethers, which Laura uses to capture and restrain her opponents while she attacks them with a slow-firing but extremely powerful railgun. The Schwarzer Regen also possesses an "Active Inertial Canceller" (AIC), which can be used to stop the movement of projectiles and even another IS. While a very powerful defense, the canceller can only be used against one target at a time, and is only effective at very close range.

Laura's original purpose for coming to the IS Academy was to punish Ichika, whom she blamed for his sister withdrawing from the 2nd Mondo Grosso (unaware that Ichika was kidnapped at the time and Chifuyu withdrew in order to save him). She initially defeated Ling and Cecilia but struggled in the tournament against the pair of Ichika and Charlotte, as they had planned their attacks beforehand (unlike Laura, who does not excel with allies). After Charlotte beat her during the class tournament, the dormant VT-System within Laura's IS activated, causing her to go berserk. She was then stopped by Ichika, who also calmed and consoled her in the Inter-IS subspace. After consoling her in the subspace, she realizes what Chifuyu sees in him and falls in love with him. Upon learning Ichika's strength is his freedom to choose and helping those around him and Chifuyu's advice, Laura decides to become Ichika's bodyguard to protect him against the other girls by kissing him in front of his class and professes that he is her "bride", a misunderstanding of her knowledge of Japanese culture, and she will not accept any objections.

Tatenashi is the Student Council President of the IS Academy, as well as the 17th leader of the Sarashiki Family and the IS Representative of Russia. The long history of her traditional family, it is actually a secret organization that's been protesting Phantom Task for over 50 years. She is the Academy's most powerful IS pilot (the position of Student Council President is only given to the strongest IS Academy student). She is assigned to protect Ichika after the Silver Gospel incident and used her position as president to become Ichika's roommate (much to Houki's jealousy). Tatenashi likes to flirt with Ichika, teasing him with her body and making him uncomfortable most of the time. She asked for his help in getting her younger sister Kanzashi's IS operational in time for the school competition. She is the pilot of the  IS. At the end of Volume 8, she reveals her true name  to Ichika for saving her from American soldiers, indicating some affection has grown between them. For the first time Tatenashi has developed sincere love and now feeling shaky around Ichika hoping to have him marry her someday.

Kanzashi is Tatenashi's younger sister and the IS Representative of Japan. Kanzashi is a fan of anime heroes. Despite being an IS Representative, she does not have a personal IS. The company that was developing her personal IS also produced the Byakushiki. Due to Ichika's rise in fame, the development of his IS unit was given priority over hers, and as a result, she harbors a resentment towards Ichika, not that he had anything to do with the decision. In addition, Kanzashi has always competed against her older sister and feels incompetent when compared to her. Kanzashi falls in love with Ichika for his kindness in helping her, and her view towards Tatenashi changes when she realizes that she has been competing with an idealized conception of Tatenashi and comes to be more accepting of her own accomplishments.

IS Academy staff

Chifuyu is Ichika's 24-year-old older sister, and homeroom teacher of his class at the Academy. She was the Japanese pilot for the first-generation IS machines and was said to be the strongest IS pilot at one point before retiring. During her retirement, she looked after her brother and raised him by herself after their parents abandoned them at a young age. Despite her indifference towards Ichika, Chifuyu deeply cares for her brother, as she sees him as her only family. Chifuyu was also the one who enrolled Ichika to the IS Academy to keep him safe from other countries. Chifuyu once wielded Yukihira, a powerful IS energy blade now in Ichika's possession. Chifuyu was a close friend of Tabane Shinonono, which explains how their younger siblings became childhood friends. Tabane also implies (heavily) that Chifuyu piloted the –the first ever developed IS that protected Japan when 2,341 missiles were launched towards the country simultaneously due to a hack 10 years prior to the series. Her IS currently is called the Kurezakura.

Yamada is the substitute instructor of Ichika's class, possessing a noticeably large bust. She used to be an IS Representative Cadet of Japan. In the anime, her skills become very apparent, as during a training exercise she was able to single-handedly defeat both Cecilia and Lingyin, in their personal IS units, using only a mass-produced Rafale Revive IS.

Phantom Task

Madoka is Chifuyu and Ichika's younger sister and twin sister who has a striking resemblance to Chifuyu and harbors a grudge against her (possibly something having to do with their separation), and is a primary antagonist of the series. It is revealed, Madoka is the head of the Phantom Task organization, under the codename: M. She pilots the Silent Zephyrs, a 3rd generation IS stolen from England and based on Cecilia's Blue Tears. It appears to be more advanced than its predecessor. She later pilots the "Black Knight" that was given to her by Tabane for unknown reasons. In Vol 12, Madoka is later revealed to be an artificial being created from Chifuyu's DNA, meant to act as her successor.

Squall is the leader of Phantom Task Squad. Not much is known about her. She combines with an unusual IS called the Golden Dawn, its generation is unknown. Squall has enough confidence in her skills, and is a highly trained and dangerous fighter with incredible reflexes. She usually displays herself as polite, and ladylike in front of other. While she can be very ruthless when she want to be and doesn't mind using force, but doesn't like overdoing unnecessary things when she order Madoka not to kill the soldiers at the American base. Her main objective seems to collect data on Ichika's Byakushiki (in White Knight form) for a purpose yet to be revealed.

Autumn is a rash, hot headed member who fought with Ichika during the IS academy's anniversary and almost succeeded in stealing the Byakushiki, with a device called the 'Remover', only to fail at the last minute when Tatenashi interfered. She pilots the Arachne, an eight-legged 2nd generation IS that was stolen from the USA. She is hinted to have a homosexual relationship with Squall, uncharacteristically blushing like a little girl upon seeing Squall.

Other characters

Tabane is Houki's older sister and the creator of the IS. She mysteriously disappeared after introducing the IS technology, and is currently the most wanted person in the world as many seek her for her knowledge about it. She is a close friend of Chifuyu, Ichika's older sister. Houki resents being related to her, due to what happened to their family and Ichika six years ago, and has hated her since. Tabane and Chifuyu's connections, is the reason Ichika and Houki became childhood friends. Despite her normally cheerful nature, she has a condescending view towards outsiders and strangers and will often treat anybody besides Chifuyu, Houki, and Ichika with disdain. Tabane has a thing for rabbits, hence the metal bunny ears on her head and the carrot pod she arrived in to give Houki her IS. During a conversation with Chifuyu she admits to having initially reprogrammed the first IS to be compatible for Ichika, however she doesn't know how the Byakushiki moves while Ichika is piloting it.  She is shown to be very proficient in combat when she easily held her own against three members of Phantom Task.

Clarissa is Laura's comrade and the deputy commander of Schwarzer Hase. Like Laura, she also wears an eyepatch. An Otaku, Clarissa teaches Laura about Japanese culture through anime and manga (which is, even in reality, not very accurate). She is the pilot of the IS .

Natasha is the IS Representative Cadet of the United States. It is only when the intervention by Ichika and the rest of his comrades are they able to stop the Silver Gospel. As gratitude for saving her life, Natasha kisses Ichika on the cheek as thanks, much to the anger of the girls.

Dan is a close friend of Ichika's back from middle school. He is often threatened (and sometimes beaten) by his younger sister, Ran. Dan is also the only other notable male character besides Ichika in the series.

Ran is Dan's younger sister. She is currently in her third year of middle school and is the student council president. Ran apparently has a crush on Ichika. She plans to enroll at the IS academy, after revealing that she ranked A on an IS aptitude test. A few of the other girls such as Lingyin already see her as a rival for Ichika's affection.

Media

Light novels
Infinite Stratos began as a light novel series written by Izuru Yumizuru, with illustrations provided by Okiura. The first volume was published by Media Factory under their MF Bunko J label on May 31, 2009. As of April 25, 2018, twelve volumes have been released.

Due to conflict between the publisher (Media Factory) and the author, publication of the light novels was under suspension. Later, the author confirmed that he is simultaneously writing a new work and continuing Infinite Stratos through Kodansha. The novels are now being published by Overlap under their Overlap Bunko imprint, with CHOCO replacing Okiura as illustrator. Reprints of the first seven volumes begun on April 25, 2013, starting with the first two volumes. The series will end in the 13th volume.

The light novels are being translated into traditional Chinese and the first volume was published and released by Sharp Point Press on November 9, 2010. The Chinese translations of the light novels were originally under an indefinite suspension. Yumizuru cited that Media Factory's overseas representatives were engaging in contracts with foreign publishers without the author's permission as the reason for the suspension. Yumizuru had also stated that he was willing to fight over this matter in court if necessary.

On February 27, 2018, J-Novel Club announced it had licensed and begun translating the series into English.

Manga
A manga adaptation by Kenji Akahoshi began serialization in the manga magazine Monthly Comic Alive on May 27, 2010, its July 2010 issue, and ended in the September 2012 issue on July 27, 2012. The first bound volume was released on December 22, 2010, and released five volumes until September 21, 2012 under their Alive Comics imprint.

Homura Yūki launched a second manga adaptation in Shogakukan's seinen manga magazine Monthly Sunday Gene-X on May 18, 2013.  The manga went on hiatus starting on June 19, 2018, and returned in 2019. The manga finished on February 19, 2020. Shogakukan collected its chapters in eight tankōbon volumes, released from November 19, 2013 to March 19, 2020.

Internet radio
An Internet radio show named Radio IS, produced by Super A&G+, aired from January 1 to March 26, 2011. The show was hosted by Yōko Hikasa, the voice actor of Houki Shinonono, and Asami Shimoda, the voice actor of Lingyin Huang. The first episode was available in the listening archives for three weeks, whereas subsequent episodes were available for two weeks. A second radio show, called  began airing on April 9, 2011, and aired four biweekly episodes until May 21, 2011.

Anime

An anime adaptation for Infinite Stratos was first announced on June 21, 2010, and its official website opening on August 8, 2010. The adaptation is directed by Yasuhito Kikuchi who also directed Macross Frontier with Eight Bit, who also handled Macross Frontier, animating the adaptation. The character designer and chief animation director of the anime is Takeyasu Kurashima and the mecha designer is Takeshi Takakura. The script was handled by Atsuhiro Tomioka, Chinatsu Hōjō, and Fumihiko Shimo. Shimo will also be handling the series' composition. The anime aired in Japan between January 7 to April 1, 2011 on TBS, with subsequent runs on CBC, SUN-TV, KBS, and BS-TBS. Six DVD and Blu-ray volumes were released by Media Factory between March 30 and September 21, 2011. An original video animation (OVA) episode, entitled , was released in Japan on DVD and Blu-ray on December 7, 2011. A second season of the anime series was announced in April 2013.

The anime is licensed in North America by Sentai Filmworks, with simulcasts provided by Anime Network on its video website. Section23 Films released the series and the OVA with an English dub (produced by Seraphim Digital) on DVD and Blu-ray on April 10, 2012.

The first season of the anime is licensed in the United Kingdom by MVM Films for release on February 17, 2014 on DVD.

The second season of the anime aired from October 4 to December 20, 2013. Sentai Filmworks has also acquired the second season for streaming and home video release in 2014.

The anime's soundtrack is composed by Hikaru Nanase. The opening theme song for the anime is "Straight Jet", performed by Minami Kuribayashi. The ending theme song is "Super∞Stream", with the first episode version sung by Yōko Hikasa, the second and third episode version sung by Hikasa and Yukana, the fourth and fifth episode version sung by Hikasa, Yukana and Asami Shimoda, the sixth and seventh episode version sung by Hikasa, Yukana, Shimoda and Kana Hanazawa and the final version for the rest of episodes sung by Hikasa, Yukana, Shimoda, Hanazawa and Marina Inoue. Each version of the song reflects the voice actresses' character who is running with Ichika in the episodes' ending credits. The CD single for "Straight Jet" was released on January 26, 2011, and the CD single for "Super∞Stream" was released on February 16, 2011. Both singles are published under the Lantis label. For the second season, the opening theme is "True Blue Traveler" by Minami Kuribayashi and the ending theme is "Beautiful Sky" by Yōko Hikasa.

Games
A 2014 video game, titled Infinite Stratos 2: Ignition Hearts for the PlayStation 3 and PlayStation Vita, was released in Japan on February 27, 2014. Its plot focuses on memories from Ichika's school festival, and is developed by 5pb. A TCG game from Bushiroad's Five gross was released on November 8, 2013. Characters from Infinite Stratos also feature in the PlayStation Vita game Kaku-San-Sei Million Arthur.

A PC mecha action game developed by 5pb. titled Infinite Stratos: Versus Colors was released in Japan on December 31, 2014. Another video game titled Infinite Stratos 2: Love and Purge for the PlayStation 3 and PlayStation Vita was released in Japan on September 3, 2015. A cross-platform Gacha game titled  was released by DMM Games in December 2017, and was shutdown on August 27, 2018. However, an offline version of the game is still available for download and play.

Reception and sales

The light novels have collectively sold 1.2 million copies as of February 2011.

The opening theme of the anime adaptation, "Straight Jet", reached No. 16, and the ending theme, "Super∞Stream", reached No. 10 on the Oricon charts. The Blu-ray release of its first volume sold around 22,000 copies in its first week, becoming only the sixth-ever first volume of any anime television series to reach number 1 on Oricon's Blu-ray Disc weekly overall sales chart.

Theron Martin of Anime News Network criticized the anime for its "unbelievably dense protagonist" and weak storyline, but the action sequences received praise.

References

External links

 Official light novel website at Media Factory 
 Official light novel website at Overlap 
 Official anime website for Infinite Stratos at TBS 
 Official anime website for Infinite Stratos 2 at TBS 
 
 

2009 Japanese novels
2010 manga
2011 anime OVAs
2011 anime television series debuts
2014 video games
2017 video games
Action video games
Anime and manga based on light novels
Eight Bit (studio)
Harem anime and manga
J-Novel Club books
Japan-exclusive video games
Light novels
MF Bunko J
Madman Entertainment anime
Mass media franchises
Mecha anime and manga
Media Factory manga
Military anime and manga
Military science fiction video games
Military science fiction
Overlap Bunko
PlayStation 3 games
PlayStation Vita games
Romantic comedy anime and manga
Science fiction video games
Seinen manga
Sentai Filmworks
Sharp Point Press titles
Shogakukan manga
Television series set in the future
Television shows set in Asia
Television shows set in Japan
Television shows set in Tokyo
TBS Television (Japan) original programming
Video games about mecha
Video games about robots
Video games developed in Japan
Video games set in Asia
Video games set in Japan
Visual novels
War video games set in Asia
War video games
Windows games